The 27th Infantry Division (27-ya Pekhotnaya Diviziya) was an infantry formation of the Russian Imperial Army. It was a part of the 3rd Army Corps.

Organization
1st Brigade
105th Infantry Regiment
106th Infantry Regiment
2nd Brigade
107th Infantry Regiment
108th Infantry Regiment
27th Artillery Brigade

Commanders
1863-1876: Nikolay Kridener
11/01/1876 - 11/08/1888 - Major General (from 08/30/1878 Lieutenant General) Zalesov, Nikolai Gavrilovich
хх.хх.1888 - 03.03.1889 - Lieutenant General Depp, Alexander-August Filippovich
04.16.1889 - xx.02.1890 - Lieutenant General Elzhanovsky, Kazimir Yulianovich
03/04/1890 - 03/07/1891 - Lieutenant General Rykachev, Stepan Vasilievich
03/13/1891 - 12/07/1892 - Lieutenant General Timrot, Karl Alexandrovich
09.12.1892 - 01.18, 1896 - Major General (from August 30, 1893 Lieutenant General) Tyvalovich, Ivan Ivanovich
18.01.1896 - 18.08.1898 - Major General (from 14 May, 1896 Lieutenant General) Gets, Dmitry Nikolaevich
26 October, 1898 - 03.09, 1904 - Major General (from 06.12, 1898 Lieutenant General) Arkady Skugarevsky
11/19, 1904 - 12/06/1906 - Major General Sivers, Faddey Vasilievich
06.12.1906 - 16.01.1909 - Lieutenant General Shvank, Leonid Alexandrovich
01/27/1909 - 02/19/1914 - Lieutenant General Fleischer, Rafail Nikolaevich
02/19/1914 - 03/13/1914 - Lieutenant General Abakanovich, Stanislav Konstantinovich
04/02/1914 - 02/02/1915 - Lieutenant General Adaridi, August-Karl-Mikhail Mikhailovich
02/08/1915 - 04/04/1915 - Lieutenant General Johnson, Herbert Georgievich
04/04/1915 - 02/18/1916 - Major General Asmus, Konstantin Vladimirovich
03/19/1916 - 04/18/1917 - Lieutenant General Stavrovich, Nikolai Grigorievich
from 18.04.1917 - Major General Bonch-Bogdanovsky, Alexander Mikhailovich

Chiefs of Staff
10.10.1865 - 24.04.1872 - Lieutenant Colonel (from 31.03.1868 Colonel) Butenko, Semyon Ivanovich
04/29/1872 - xx.xx.1875 - Colonel Ustrugov, Dmitry Ivanovich
07/05/1875 - 09/12/1883 - Colonel Drozdovich, Emelyan Mikhailovich
09/23/1883 - 01/14/1885 - etc. Colonel Novogrebelsky, Stanislav Stanislavovich
14.01.1885 - 04.04.1886 - Colonel Pnevsky, Vyacheslav Ivanovich
04.04.1886 - 03.19.1890 - Colonel Claus, Pavel Fedorovich
03/22/1890 - 07/09/1891 - Colonel Melnitsky, Yuri Dmitrievich
07/15/1891 - 03/19/1898 - Colonel Churin, Alexey Evgrafovich
03/27/1898 - 12/10/1900 - Colonel Vladimir Apollonovich Olokhov
07.01.1901 - 25.04.1903 - Colonel Stremoukhov, Nikolai Petrovich
05/20/1903 - 06/15/1907 - lieutenant colonel (from 06.12.1903 colonel) Baiov, Konstantin Konstantinovich
03.07.1907 - 08.05.1908 - Colonel Linda, Konstantin Pavlovich
05/13/1908 - 09/23/1912 - Colonel Butchik, Mikhail Mikhailovich
09/25/1912 - 12/10/1914 - Colonel Radus-Zenkovich, Lev Apollonovich
12/31/1914 - 03/19/1915 - Colonel Dreyer, Vladimir Nikolaevich von
05/16/1915 - 05/02/1916 - and. D. Colonel Menchukov, Evgeny Alexandrovich
05/02/1916 - 08/31/1916 - Colonel Cheglov, Mikhail Petrovich
08/31/1916 - 01/27/1917 - Colonel Vlasyev, Nikolai Ivanovich
02/08/1917 - 10/09/1917 - and. D. Colonel Erofeev, Grigory Kirillovich
from 19.10.1917 - Colonel (from 21.11.1917 Major General) Gamchenko, Evgeniy Spiridonovich

Commanders of the 1st Brigade
08/30/1873 - xx.xx, 1874 - Major General Pakhomov, Pyotr Alekseevich
09/12/1874 - 10/01, 1874 - Major General Nikolai Nikolayevich Malakhov
01.10.1874 - 22.02, 1877 - Major General Kuzmin, Ilya Alexandrovich
02/03/1878 - xx.xx, 1881 - Major General Alexandrov, Nikolai Ivanovich
06.16.1881 - 06.30.1886 - Major General Baron von Geyking, Fedor Fedorovich
07/03/1886 - 01/21/1889 - Major General Protsenko, Pyotr Petrovich
02/18/1889 - 02/25/1891 - Major General Baron Rosen, Alexander-Stepan Fridrikhovich
03.03.1891 - 07.10.1899 - Major General Rozhnov, Leopold Ivanovich
October 31, 1899 - May 29, 1903 - Major General Poltorzhitsky, Joseph Suleimanovich
June 4, 1903 - February 29, 1904 - Major General Schultz, Dmitry Lvovich
March 2, 1904 - October 22, 1904 - Major General Alexander Ragoza
8 November, 1904 - 04.09, 1906 - Major General Kazakevich, Ignatiy Fedorovich
06.10.1906 - 17.10.1910 - Major General von Torklus, Fyodor-Emiliy-Karl Ivanovich
12/29/1910 - until 05/02/1913 - Major General Gursky, Ivan Ignatievich
1913-1914: Mikhail Sokovin
February 8, 1914 - May 13, 1914 - Major General Palibin, Pyotr Pavlovich
July 7, 1914 - July 29, 1914 - Major General Yanovsky, Nikolai Kirillovich

References

Infantry divisions of the Russian Empire
Military units and formations established in 1863
Military units and formations disestablished in 1918